Pops may refer to:

Name or nickname
 Pops, an informal term of address for a father or elder
 Pops (nickname), a list of people
 Pops (Muppet), a Muppets character
 Pops (Johnny Bravo), a character from the Cartoon Network animated television series Johnny Bravo
 Pops Maellard, a fictional character in the Cartoon Network animated series Regular Show
 Pops Mensah-Bonsu, a British basketball executive and former player

Other uses
 Sirius XM Pops, a Sirius XM Satellite Radio station
 Pops CB, a baseball club in Spain in the 1950s and '60s
 Pops (restaurant), a themed roadside attraction in Arcadia, Oklahoma
 Privately owned public space (POPS), a physical space that, though privately owned, is open to the public
 Persistent organic pollutants (POPs), organic compounds that are resistant to environmental degradation

See also
 Pops orchestra, an orchestra that plays popular music (generally traditional pop) and show tunes as well as well-known classical works, including:
 Boston Pops Orchestra, a subsection of the Boston Symphony Orchestra
 Philly Pops
 Corn Pops (also termed Pops), a Kellogg's breakfast cereal
 Pop (disambiguation)